The men's eight competition at the 1936 Summer Olympics took place at Grünau Regatta Course in Berlin, Germany. The event was held from 12 to 14 August, and was won by a United States crew from the University of Washington. This event is chronicled in The Boys in the Boat written by Daniel James Brown. There were 14 boats (126 competitors) from 14 nations, with each nation limited to a single boat in the event. The victory was the fifth consecutive gold medal in the event for the United States and seventh overall; the Americans had won every time they competed (missing 1908 and 1912). Italy repeated as silver medalists. Germany earned its first medal in the men's eight since 1912 with its bronze. Canada's three-Games podium streak ended.

Background

This was the ninth appearance of the event. Rowing had been on the programme in 1896 but was cancelled due to bad weather. The men's eight has been held every time that rowing has been contested, beginning in 1900.

The United States was the dominant nation in the event, with the nation winning the previous four Olympic men's eight competitions (as well as the other two competitions which the United States had entered). The American squad this year came from the University of Washington, which had won the 1936 Intercollegiate Rowing Association Regatta. Switzerland had won the 1936 Grand Challenge Cup. Hungary had won the 1933, 1934, and 1935 European championships. The Australian crew was all police crew from the New South Wales Policeman's Rowing Club in Sydney who had dominated at state titles for the previous two years. They were selected in toto with their attendance funded by the NSW Police Federation. 

Yugoslavia made its debut in the event. Canada, Great Britain, and the United States each made their seventh appearance, tied for most among nations to that point.

Competition format

The "eight" event featured nine-person boats, with eight rowers and a coxswain. It was a sweep rowing event, with the rowers each having one oar (and thus each rowing on one side). The course used the 2000 metres distance that became the Olympic standard in 1912.

The 1936 competition had a six-boat final for the first time. The competition continued to use the three-round format used in 1932, with two main rounds (semifinals and a final) and a repechage.

 The semifinals placed the 14 boats in 3 heats, with 4 or 5 boats per heat. The winner of each heat (3 boats total) advanced directly to the final, while the other boats (11 total) went to the repechage.
 The repechage had 11 boats. They were placed in 3 heats, with 3 or 4 boats each. The winner of each repechage heat (3 boats) rejoined the semifinal winners in the final, with the other boats (8 total) eliminated.
 The final round consisted of a single final for the medals and 4th through 6th place.

Schedule

Results

Semifinals

12 August. The first boat in each heat advanced directly to final. The other boats competed again in the repechage for remaining spots in the final.

Semifinal 1

Semifinal 2

Semifinal 3

Repechage

13 August. The winner of each race advanced to the final; the other boats were eliminated.

Repechage heat 1

Repechage heat 2

Repechage heat 3

14 August.

Final

References

External links

Rowing at the 1936 Summer Olympics